Randy Sageman (born 9 April 1960) is a Canadian diver. He competed in the men's 3 metre springboard event at the 1984 Summer Olympics.

References

External links
 

1960 births
Living people
Canadian male divers
Olympic divers of Canada
Divers at the 1984 Summer Olympics
Divers from London, Ontario